AirportWatch is an environmental group which campaigns for sustainable air transport through reduction or redistribution of demand, determined by either timing or location (Demand Management approach).

History
AirportWatch was formed in 2000.

In the run-up to the 2007 Camp for Climate Action near Heathrow Airport, BAA sought an injunction, banning members of groups supporting AirportWatch, such as the National Trust and Greenpeace, from attending the protest. The airport operator won a reduced injunction naming senior members of AirportWatch and Plane Stupid, but not including AirportWatch or its members.

AirportWatch is a member of the Stop Climate Chaos Coalition.

Campaign Issues
These campaign issues have been identified by AirportWatch:
 Climate change effect of the carbon dioxide emissions
 Noise complaints by local communities near airports
 Environmental impact near airports
 Growth in low-cost holiday flights affecting the UK economy
 Possible environmental effects from aviation
 Effectiveness of carbon offsetting in removing  from the atmosphere

See also

Air transport and the environment (United Kingdom)
Carbon offsetting
Climate Change
Environmental direct action in the United Kingdom
Flying Matters a pro-aviation expansion commercial coalition
Heathrow Airport
Stop Stansted Expansion

References

External links
AirportWatch website

Aviation organisations based in the United Kingdom
Transport advocacy groups of the United Kingdom
2000 establishments in the United Kingdom
Organizations established in 2000
Airports in the United Kingdom